Asier Santana Clavo (born 3 February 1979) is a Spanish football manager, who is currently in charge of Club Portugalete.

Manager career
Born in Idiazabal, Goierri, Gipuzkoa, Santana joined Real Sociedad in 2006, being appointed manager of the youth setup. In 2008, he moved to the reserve squad, being Imanol Idiakez and Meho Kodro's assistant.

On 17 June 2013 Santana was named manager of the B-team, signing a two-year deal. On 5 November of the following year he was appointed at the helm of the main squad, as an interim, replacing fired Jagoba Arrasate.

Santana appeared in his first professional match on 9 November 2014, a 2–1 home win against Atlético Madrid. He was subsequently named David Moyes' assistant, remaining in the first team.

In June 2016, Santana was hired by third-tier Real Unión but still on the payroll of Sociedad, who were helping out with the Irun-based club's financial problems. He was dismissed on 27 November 2017 due to a poor run of results, with the severance payment being again the responsibility of the larger club.

Santana returned to the game on 29 January 2020, taking over at UCAM Murcia CF until the end of the season.

Managerial statistics

References

External links

1979 births
Living people
People from Goierri
Spanish football managers
La Liga managers
Segunda División B managers
Real Sociedad B managers
Real Sociedad managers
Real Unión managers
UCAM Murcia CF managers
Real Sociedad non-playing staff
Sportspeople from Gipuzkoa